Hedera nepalensis (Himalayan ivy, chang chun teng) is a species of perennial Ivy (genus Hedera) native to Nepal and Bhutan, as well as Afghanistan, Pakistan, India, China, Laos, Myanmar, Thailand, and Vietnam, at altitudes of about 1000–3000 m. Plants grow up to 30 m in height, with simple leaves ranging from 2–15 cm long, and yellow flowers.

Morphology
Stem: creeping or climbing to a height of 30 m with adventitious roots. Evergreen foliage, dark green, glossy, lighter underneath, glabrous, leathery, lanceolate, oval, to klapowanych (flaps odd, usually 3, triangular), u heart-shaped base of the wedge, the top slightly pointed or blunt.
Flowers: bisexual, small, 5-fold, meeting within the fond ovate panicles. Flower stalks (length 7–12 mm) and Flowering hairy. Chalice entire edges, retained. Petals yellow crown. Stamens 5, anthers 1–2 mm long. Pillar short neck, single, Fruit is a drupes, flattened, 5–7 mm long, 5–10 mm wide, with orange to red.

Ecology
The plant blooms from October to April.

Plant toxic, all parts are poisonous because they contain saponins (e.g. hederynę), which are irritating to the skin, and conjunctiva of eyes, and after ingestion induce gastrointestinal nervous system, disturbances. Can occur hemolysis and erythrocytes.

It occurs mostly in moist soil in shade, at the height of 1000–3000 m as climbs over rocks and tree trunks by adventitious roots, rarely used as a ground cover or decorative climber in gardens and parks. Resistance to frost apparently large (up to 8 zones USDA).

There are two varieties or subspecies:

Hedera nepalensis var. nepalensis
''Hedera nepalensis K. Koch var. Sinensis (Tobler) Rehder - occurs in the China.

Synonyms
 Hedera cinerea
 Hedera himalaica
 Hedera helix var. chrysocarpa
 Hedera helix var. cinerea
 Hedera helix var. himalaica

References

 
 eFloras entry
 Hort. dendrol. 284, t. 75. 1854.
 Ackerfield, J. 2001. Trichome morphology in Hedera (Araliaceae). Edinburgh J. Bot. 58:259–267.
 Chinese Academy of Sciences. 1959–. Flora reipublicae popularis sinicae.
 Encke, F. et al. 1984. Zander: Handwörterbuch der Pflanzennamen, 13. Auflage.
 Hara, H. et al. 1978–1982. An enumeration of the flowering plants of Nepal.
 Lawrence, G. H. M. & A. E. Schulze. 1942. The cultivated Hederas. Gentes Herb. 6:107–173.
 Liberty Hyde Bailey Hortorium. 1976. Hortus third.
 Nasir, E. & S. I. Ali, eds. 1970–. Flora of [West] Pakistan.

nepalensis
Plants described in 1853